Ahmadabad (also Romanized as Aḩmadābād) is a city in the Central District of Ardakan County, Yazd province, Iran. At the 2006 census, its population was 4,693 in 1,228 households. The following census in 2011 counted 5,019 people in 1,527 households. The latest census in 2016 showed a population of 6,046 people in 1,919 households.

References 

Ardakan County

Cities in Yazd Province

Populated places in Yazd Province

Populated places in Ardakan County